Štitar may refer to:

 Štitar, Serbia, a village near Šabac in Serbia
 Štitar, Croatia, a village and municipality in eastern Croatia